Rosemary Laing (born 1959) is an Australian photographer. She originally trained as a painter before moving to the medium of photography. Laing has taught art at the University of New South Wales, College of Fine Arts. With over 100 exhibitions, Laing is widely known for her leading role in the concept-based photography field. Since her start in the photography field, Laing has explored conceptual photography, with most of her works being a part of a series in order to convey her concepts.

Life 

Originally trained as a painter, from 1976 to 1979 Laing completed a Diploma of Art Education at the Brisbane College of Advanced Education in Queensland. She then went on to get her Diploma of Art in 1982 from the University of Tasmania in Hobart. Eight years later, from 1990 to 1991, Laing gained a Post Graduate Diploma from the Sydney College of the Arts in Sydney. And then, from 1992 to 1996 she completed a Master of Fine Arts in Honours Class 1, from the College of Fine Arts, New South Wales.

Laing originally used photography as reference material. She gained a job as an exhibition consultant in 1988, for the Australian Bicentennial Exhibition. This proved a step forward for Laing and her career. Editing work from some of the top photographers from around the country enabled her to see how they decided to represent the country. In 2000 Laing had her real breakthrough with the series Flight research.

Work 

Some of Laing's most noteworthy series include Bulletproof glass and Groundspeed.
Bulletproof glass is a series of images shot on location in the Blue Mountains, featuring women dressed in vintage wedding dresses with gunshot wounds to the chest whilst 'floating' in the sky. Some specific negative ideas that fed into this series include the unsuccessful Republican referendum in Australia, and the blatant refusal by the Government to apologise to the Aboriginal peoples of Australia.
The series Groundspeed is a mix between an installation piece and photography. Laing visited the eucalyptus forests in South Australia and laid down carpet on the forest floor. With assistance Laing was able to produce multiple landscape images of the scene.
"Flight sits in our consciousness as a kind of fantasy or dream. It is a metaphorical notion. Children dream of flying. It is a very escapist notion to be able to fly. Superheroes fly. Then you’ve got Yves Klein’s Leap into the void. I was interested in unfettering the body from the mechanics of flight" -Rosemary Laing

Much of Laing's work is influenced by issues at the time, which becomes apparent in particular photographic series. Such influences include the unsuccessful Republican referendum in Australia, and the refusal by the Government to apologise to the Aboriginal peoples of Australia, which influenced her Groundspeed series. The effect that natural disasters had on the Australian landscape and the lives of those they affected influenced Laing to explore the ideas related to this through documentary photography. The series that arose from this exploration was titled one dozen unnatural disasters in the Australian landscape.

A vast majority of Laing's artworks relate strongly to cultural and historical places throughout Australia. With staged sceneries, Laing involves the politics of particular locations as well as elements of current and modern culture. Laing became interested in flight in 1994, when she moved to a studio in Leichardt, Sydney which was directly under the flight path. Her growing annoyance with the sounds from planes passing overhead fueled her interest in the ideas of air travel, which in turn was the inspiration for her Flight Research series.

Since 1996, Laing has generally avoided digitally manipulating any of her images, which is what makes the subject matter in some of her images so surreal.

Awards and honours
Over the span of her career, Laing has accomplished many things and has won multiple awards as well as research grants. Some of the awards and grants she has gained include:
 1999 National Photographic Purchase Award, from the Albury Wodonga Regional Art Foundation.
 1996 Faculty Research Grant, from the College of Fine Arts, University of New South Wales
 1990 Rothmans Foundation Postgraduate Scholarship, from the Sydney College of the Arts
 1989 Artists Development Grant, Visual Arts/Craft Board of the Australia Council

Exhibitions
Rosemary Laing has been exhibited in over 100 exhibitions since the 1980s, both individually and in a group. Laing has had her works exhibited all over the globe, including Germany, Australia, the US, Spain, Japan, Switzerland, New Zealand and Finland. She has her works held at both national and international museum collections. These include the Museo Nacional Centro de Arte Reina Sofia in Madrid, Spain, the North Carolina Museum of Art in Raleigh, USA, the 21st Century Museum of Contemporary Art in Kanazawa, Japan, and many more.

References

Australian photographers
1959 births
Living people